is a Japanese actor, voice actor and narrator. He is represented with Horipro Booking Agency. He rusticated from Waseda University First Literature Department.

Biography
Owada is the youngest son of three children. (he has an older brother and sister)

In 1965, he entered to a free stage by Tadashi Suzuki while entering university.

In 1968, Owada joined Shiki Theatre Company.

He became widely known as the heroine's husband on Ai yori Aoku in 1972.

In 1977, Owada's first leading role in a film was Inugami no Akuryō.

He co-starred with Kin'ya Kitaōji in Medea directed by Yukio Ninagawa.

Owada made his first appearance in a Chinese film as a Japanese in Honō no Onna Shūkin.

He played as a minor in Mito Kōmon, in which his character firstly established the verbal phrase "Kochira ni owasu Okata o Donata to Kokoroeru! Osoreōku mo Mae no Fuku Shōgun, Mito Mitsukunikō ni Ara se rareru zo!!" ("A man who knows who you are here will know what to do! Fearfully you will be made to exist in the former deputy general, Mito Mitsukuni!!") to state when stamping a seal basket (Super Friday: Mito Kōmon Special (Tokyo Broadcasting System, aired 25 July 2003)).

In the Japanese dub version of The Lion King Owada is known for voicing King Mufasa.

Filmography

TV dramas

Films

Anime television

Anime films

Video games

Dubbing

Supervision works

Productions

Discography

References

Notes

External links

Shinya Owada at all cinema 
Shinya Owada at Kinenote 

Shinya Owada at Movie Walker 
Shinya Owada at the TV Drama Database 
 
 
 at Horipro 

Japanese male film actors
Japanese male television actors
Japanese male video game actors
Japanese male voice actors
Horipro artists
People from Tsuruga, Fukui
Male voice actors from Fukui Prefecture
1947 births
Living people
20th-century Japanese male actors
21st-century Japanese male actors